Daniel Faitaua (born 11 May 1976) is a New Zealand television news reporter of Samoan descent. He was the 1 News Europe correspondent, based in London, from 2019 to 2022 and was previously newsreader on Breakfast and 1 News At Midday.

Early and personal life
Faitaua was born in Christchurch, where he attended Catholic Cathedral College, later graduating from the University of Canterbury before studying at the New Zealand Broadcasting School at CPIT (now Ara Institute of Canterbury), from which he graduated in 2009.

He is married, with three children.

Journalism and broadcast career
He worked as a reporter on TVNZ's Close Up for three years, and also served as a backup host on political talk show Back Benches before moving to the network's main news programme.

Faitaua was involved in a support campaign for people suffering stress after the 2011 Christchurch earthquake, Address The Stress.

See also
 List of New Zealand television personalities

References

People from Christchurch
Living people
New Zealand broadcasters
New Zealand people of Samoan descent
1976 births
People educated at Catholic Cathedral College